The Bellanca CH-400 Skyrocket is a six-seat utility aircraft built in the United States in the 1930s, a continuation of the design lineage that had started with the Bellanca WB-2. Retaining the same basic airframe of the preceding CH-200 and CH-300, the CH-400 was fitted with a more powerful Pratt & Whitney Wasp radial engine.

Three examples were purchased by the U.S. Navy under the designation RE. Two were used for radio research, and one as an air ambulance for the U.S. Marine Corps. This latter aircraft was reconfigured to carry two stretchers.

The aircraft was also available in a deluxe version for private pilot owners, fitted with a more powerful Wasp variant providing 450 hp (336 kW) and detail enhancements.

Two of these aircraft were purchased by the government of the Dominion of Newfoundland in 1937, and one later ended in private hands. NC10294 was changed to VO-BCD and NC13155 to VO-BDF.

Variants
CH-400 Six-seat utility aircraft., powered by a Pratt & Whitney Wasp radial piston engine.
XRE-1 One aircraft used for radio research work at Naval Air Station Anacostia.
XRE-2 One light transport aircraft for the US Navy.
XRE-3 One two-stretcher air ambulance aircraft for the US Marine Corps.

Military operators

United States Marine Corps
United States Navy

Specifications (CH-400 Skyrocket)

References

 
 aerofiles.com

CH-400
High-wing aircraft
Single-engined tractor aircraft
1930s United States civil utility aircraft
Aircraft first flown in 1930